Tingvollvågen or Tingvoll is the administrative centre of Tingvoll Municipality in Møre og Romsdal county, Norway. The village is located on a small inlet off the Tingvollfjorden, directly across the fjord from the village of Angvika (in Gjemnes Municipality). The historic Tingvoll Church is located in this village. Norwegian National Road 70 runs through the village on its way from Kristiansund to Oppdal.

References

Villages in Møre og Romsdal
Tingvoll